Tourism in Austria forms an important part of the country's economy, accounting for almost 9% of the Austrian gross domestic product. Austria has one guest bed for every six inhabitants, and boasts the highest per capita income from tourism in the Organisation for Economic Co-operation and Development. As of 2007, the total number of tourist overnight stays is roughly the same for summer and winter season, with peaks in February and July/August.

In 2007, Austria ranked 9th worldwide in international tourism receipts, with 18.9 billion US$. In international tourist arrivals, Austria ranked 12th with 30.8 million tourists.

Most visited areas 
Vienna attracts a major part of tourists, both in summer and winter. Salzburg receives about a fifth of tourist overnight stays compared to Vienna, which ranks it 2nd in the summer season. In the winter season, a number of winter sport resorts in western Austria overtake Salzburg in the number of tourist overnight stays: Sölden, Saalbach-Hinterglemm, Ischgl, Sankt Anton am Arlberg, and Obertauern.

Visits to Austria mostly include trips to Vienna with its Cathedral, its "Heurigen" (wine pubs) and romantic Waltz music events. Worth a visit are Salzburg, birthplace of Mozart, Innsbruck, capital of Tyrol surrounded by the Alps, Linz, capital of Upper Austria with the largest Cathedral of Austria and modern cultural highlights, and the Danube valley with its vineyards, for example the Wachau or Dunkelsteinerwald, which are between Melk and Krems. In the western part of the country the province Vorarlberg reaches the Lake Constance, in the eastern part Neusiedler See. The three most visited landmarks in Austria are Schönbrunn Palace (2,590,000 visitors per year), Tiergarten Schönbrunn (2,453,987 visitors) and Mariazell Basilica (1,500,000 visitors).

Sports and nature 

Of great touristic importance are the Austrian skiing, hiking and mountaineering resorts in the Alps as well as family-friendly recreation areas (e.g. the Witches's Water in Tyrol). The same applies to the numerous Austrian lakes (e.g. Wolfgangsee and other lakes in the Salzkammergut east of Salzburg or Wörthersee in Carinthia) and castles. Stretching over Vorarlberg and Tyrol, Ski Arlberg is the largest connected ski area in Austria and one of five largest ski areas in the world.

Art and culture 
For visitors interested in media art, there is the Ars Electronica Center in Linz. Since 1979 this center has organized the Ars Electronica Festival and presented the Prix Ars Electronica, the worldwide highest-ranked prize for media art.

Internationally known annual events

Arrivals by country

Most visitors arriving to Austria on short term basis are from the following countries of nationality:

Slogans of the provinces 

Burgenland – The sunny side of Austria
Carinthia – The joy of living
Lower Austria – Feel alive!
Upper Austria – ?
Salzburg – Stage of the World
Styria – The Green Heart of Austria
Tyrol – Heart of the Alps
Vienna – Now. Forever.
Vorarlberg – Poetry in Nature

Notes and references

External links

 Official Website of the Austrian National Tourist Office

 
Austria